Candy Loving (born Candis Loving; September 4, 1956) is an American model. She was Playboy's Playmate of the Month for the January 1979 issue, which made her the magazine's 25th Anniversary Playmate. Her centerfold was photographed by Dwight Hooker.

Early life
Loving was born Candis Loving in Oswego, Kansas, on September 4, 1956, and moved to Ponca City, Oklahoma, at the age of three with her mother and four siblings. She graduated from Ponca City High School in 1974 and married Ron Prather. She then enrolled as a public relations major at the University of Oklahoma.

Playboy career
In 1978, the Playboy magazine began a yearlong nationwide Great Playmate Hunt for its 25th-anniversary publication. She was a junior at the University of Oklahoma, and working in a dress shop and as a waitress when she saw the ad in the paper. At the urging of her then husband, Loving entered the contest and photographer Dwight Hooker shot the test photos of her. Seven months later the 22-year-old college student beat out more than 3,500 other models with her natural beauty, girl-next-door looks and name that seemed almost fabricated for a playmate. Her centerfold came out in the January 1979 issue. That year, she took advantage of her celebrity status and moved out to California to pursue acting and modeling. She traveled the world as the ambassador of Playboy magazine during the 25th-anniversary celebrations, taking a year out of college to do so. Promotional appearances included the National Press Club in Washington D.C., and hosting a men's fashion show. In 2001, the readers of Playboy would vote her the runner-up for "the sexiest Playmate of the 1970s."

Post Playboy
At the time of her January 1979 centerfold appearance Loving was a senior at the University of Oklahoma studying public relations. By 1981 she realized the celebrity life was not for her, so she re-enrolled at the University of Oklahoma at the age of 25 to finish her bachelor's degree in journalism, and then began a Master of Arts degree in human relations. She used the money from her work at Playboy to fund her studies. She continued to perform publicity duties for the magazine, including signing posters at car shows, and considering her career options. She later met Tampa Bay Buccaneers offensive lineman Dave Reavis when both were judging a beauty pageant. She followed him to Tampa in July 1983. Even though this relationship did not last, she remained in Southern Florida, working in the healthcare industry designing benefit packages for companies. She is no longer married but is the mother of one daughter.

Filmography
 Dance Fever (TV Series) (1979) as herself
 The Misadventures of Sheriff Lobo playing "Herself" in episode: "Who's the Sexiest Girl in the World" (episode # 1.15), February 19, 1980
 Woody Allen's Stardust Memories (1980) only in the walk-on scene at the end as Tony's girlfriend
 Playboy Playmates: The Early Years (documentary) (1982) as herself
 Playboy Video Centerfold: Playmate 2000 Bernaola Twins (Video documentary) (2000) as herself
 Playboy: The Party Continues (documentary) (2000) as herself
 Playboy: The Ultimate Playmate Search (documentary) (2003) as herself
 Playboy: 50 Years of Playmates (documentary) (2004) as herself

See also
 List of people in Playboy 1970–1979
 List of Playboy Playmates of 1979

References

External links
 
 
 

1956 births
Living people
People from Oswego, Kansas
People from Ponca City, Oklahoma
Actresses from Kansas
1970s Playboy Playmates
21st-century American women